The Reading Line is a main freight line in Pennsylvania owned and operated by Norfolk Southern Railway. It stretches from the Harrisburg Line at Wyomissing Junction in Wyomissing, Pennsylvania to a junction with the Lehigh Line in Bethlehem, Pennsylvania. The line sees about 65 trains a day, mostly trains running from Northern New Jersey and Allentown, Pennsylvania to points west and south. 

The line is mostly double-track with the only area of single track between CP Blandon and CP West Laurel. Trains go faster on this line than most others.

History 
The line opened as the East Pennsylvania Railroad on May 11, 1859, connecting Allentown with Reading. This railroad became part of the Reading Railroad, and carried traffic from the Allentown area to their main line. In 1976, The Reading Railroad was acquired by Conrail, which continued to use the line as a conduit between North Jersey and the rest of the country. When Conrail was split in 1999, Norfolk Southern was assigned the line.

The speed change was intended to increase the efficiency of rail operations and improve the flow of vehicular traffic at grade crossings.

References
 

http://www.parailfan.com/NS/ns_reading_line_ett.pdf
http://www.parailfan.com/Database/results.php
https://groups.yahoo.com/neo/groups/NSReadingline/info

Norfolk Southern Railway lines
Rail infrastructure in Pennsylvania
Reading Company lines
Railway lines opened in 1859